Saadatabad (also Romanized as Sa‘ādatābād) is a village in Khobriz Rural District, in the Central District of Arsanjan County, Fars Province, Iran. At the 2006 census, its population was 157, in 38 families.

References 

Populated places in Arsanjan County